Sigurd Frederick Sigurdson (November 27, 1918 – December 2, 2006) was an American football player who played at the end and defensive end positions.

A native of Seattle, both of his parents were born in Reykjavik, Iceland. He played college football for Pacific Lutheran University. 

Sigurdson played for the Takoma Indians of the Pacific Coast Conference in 1946. In July 1947, he signed a contract with the Baltimore Colts of the All-America Football Conference (AAFC). He played for the Colts during the 1947 season. He appeared in a total of eight AAFC games.

Sigurdson died in Seattle in 2006.

References

1918 births
2006 deaths
Baltimore Colts (1947–1950) players
Pacific Lutheran University alumni
Players of American football from Seattle